Arnie is a masculine given name or nickname. It may also refer to:

 Arnie (video game), a 1992 game for the Commodore 64
 Arnie II, a 1993 computer game, sequel to Arnie
 Arnie (TV series), a 1970s sitcom
 "Arnie", a song from the 1997 Brown Album by Primus